Robbyn is a female given name. Notable people with this name include:

 Robbyn Hermitage (born 1970), Canadian badminton player
 Robbyn Lewis (born 1963), American politician
 Robbyn Swan, American journalist and author

See also 

 Robyn (name)
 Robin (name)